Grangeria is a genus of plant in the family Chrysobalanaceae described as a genus in 1789.

Grangeria is native to certain islands in the Indian Ocean: Madagascar, Mauritius, and Réunion.

Species
 Grangeria borbonica Lam. -  Mauritius, Réunion
 Grangeria porosa Boivin ex Baill. - Madagascar

Formerly included
Grangeria brasiliensis Hoffmanns. ex Mart. & Zucc - Hirtella ciliata Mart. & Zucc. - South America

References

Chrysobalanaceae
Chrysobalanaceae genera